Hasan Khel (also written as Hasan Kheyl) is a town in Afghanistan, south of Zardad, in Zabul Province. .Hasan khel is a famous sub branch of Muhammadzai tribe.

See also
 Zabul Province

Populated places in Zabul Province